The Scout and Guide movement in Kazakhstan is served by:

 Organization of the Scout Movement of Kazakhstan, member of the World Organization of the Scout Movement
 The Kazakh Guide Association, work towards World Association of Girl Guides and Girl Scouts membership recognition remains unclear

International Scouting
In addition, there are Girl Scouts of the USA Overseas in Almaty and Atyrau, serviced by way of USAGSO headquarters in New York City; as well as Cub Scout Pack 3975 and Boy Scout Troop 395, both of Almaty, linked to the Direct Service branch of the Boy Scouts of America, which supports units around the world.

References